William "Will" Rackley III (born October 11, 1989) is a former American football offensive guard. He was drafted by the Jacksonville Jaguars in the third round of the 2011 NFL Draft. He played college football at Lehigh University.

Early years
Rackley was born in Athens, Greece. He attended Riverdale High School in Riverdale, Georgia, where he was a teammate of Cordy Glenn. He played football at Riverdale, earned first-team all-area honors as an offensive lineman and second-team all-area honors as a defensive lineman. He was recruited by Lehigh University, Lafayette College, Colgate University, and Georgia Tech, but ultimately chose to attend Lehigh. While at Lehigh, he was a member of Delta Upsilon fraternity.

College career
Rackley started in every game for the Mountain Hawks in each of his four seasons, the only one to do so in the last 20 years at Lehigh. Rackley started for coach Andy Coen in 2007, the first freshman to start at offensive line under Coen. Rackley earned first-team All-Patriot League honors from 2008 to 2010. He received his Bachelor of Arts in Design from Lehigh on May 23, 2011.

Professional career

2011 NFL Draft
Along with David Arkin, Ben Ijalana, and Brandon Fusco, Rackley was considered one of the best small-school offensive line prospects. He was drafted with the 76th overall pick in the 2011 NFL Draft by the Jacksonville Jaguars.

Jacksonville Jaguars
Rackley played 15 games in his rookie season, including 14 starts at left guard. In the 2012 preseason, right tackle Eben Britton was moved to Rackley's position of left guard. Rackley was then expected to contribute as a backup guard and center before suffering an injury. Rackley spent the 2012 season on injured reserve. In 2013, Rackley returned to the starting left guard position. He was placed on injured reserve on December 17, 2013.

Rackley was released by the Jaguars on May 12, 2014.

Baltimore Ravens
Rackley signed with the Baltimore Ravens on May 19, 2014. The Ravens placed Rackley on injured reserve on August 25, 2014, with a concussion.

References

External links
 
 

1989 births
Living people
People from Riverdale, Georgia
Sportspeople from the Atlanta metropolitan area
Players of American football from Georgia (U.S. state)
American football offensive guards
Lehigh Mountain Hawks football players
Jacksonville Jaguars players
Baltimore Ravens players
Ed Block Courage Award recipients